Dead Man's Party is the fifth album by American new wave band Oingo Boingo, released in 1985. The album contains the only two singles by the band to chart on the Billboard Hot 100: "Weird Science" at number 45, and "Just Another Day" at number 85.

The album cover art is an homage to the Mexican holiday Día de Los Muertos.

Composition
Elfman stated that he wrote the album's lead single, "Weird Science", spontaneously in his car, after receiving a call from director John Hughes about composing a song for his upcoming film of the same name. The song went on to become the band's most commercially successful single, which Elfman later regretted, as he believed it "just didn't feel like it was really a part of [the band's] repertoire".

In film and television
"Just Another Day" was featured as the opening theme for the 1985 film That Was Then... This Is Now. It also appears in season 2, episode 1 of the Netflix series Stranger Things, where it underscores Hopper's introduction scene, though somewhat anachronistically, as the episode takes place on October 28, 1984, a full year before the actual release date of the Dead Man's Party album.

The title track appears in the 1986 film Back to School, wherein the band performs the song live at a party. It also appeared in the Chuck television series, in the episode "Chuck Versus the Couch Lock".

"No One Lives Forever" appears within the opening minutes of two Cannon Group films: the 1986 production of The Texas Chainsaw Massacre 2 and the 1987 production of Down Twisted. It was later used in Casper: A Spirited Beginning (a 1997 direct-to-video release from 20th Century Fox and Saban Entertainment) and as the theme for the October 29, 2010 episode of Rachael Ray.

The song "Stay" became a hit in Brazil and was used as the theme song for the Brazilian telenovela Top Model, which increased the popularity of the band in that country and resulted in a Brazilian compilation album, Stay. It was also featured in Donnie Darko: The Director's Cut, as well as in the 2012 Australian film Any Questions for Ben?.

The final track, "Weird Science", was written for the aforementioned John Hughes film of the same name and was used again as the theme to the television series on the USA Network.

Reissue
In 2021, Rubellan Remasters issued a remastered version of Dead Man's Party on CD with seven bonus tracks.

Track listing

2021 CD bonus tracks

Charts

Personnel

Oingo Boingo
 Danny Elfman – vocals, rhythm guitar
 John Avila – bass guitars, vocals
 Steve Bartek – guitars
 Mike Bacich – keyboards
 John Hernandez – drums, percussion
 Sam Phipps – tenor saxophone
 Leon Schneiderman – baritone saxophone, alto saxophone
 Dale Turner – trumpet, trombone

Technical
 Danny Elfman – co-producer
 Steve Bartek – co-producer
 Michael Frondelli – mixing
 Bill Jackson – engineer
 David Leonard – engineer, mixing ("Weird Science")
 Stuart Farusho – second engineer (recording)
 Paul Levy – second engineer (recording)
 Mike Kloster – second engineer (recording)
 Judy Clapp – second engineer (mixing)
 Charlie Pakkari – second engineer (mixing)
 Laura Engel – studio production assistant
 Wally Traugott – mastering
 Larry Vigon – art direction, design
 Jayme Odgers – art direction, photography
 Celeste Williams – clay figure creation

References

1985 albums
Oingo Boingo albums
MCA Records albums
I.R.S. Records albums
Albums produced by Danny Elfman
Albums produced by Steve Bartek